Winstanley is an electoral ward in Wigan, England. It forms part of Wigan Metropolitan Borough Council, as well as the parliamentary constituency of Makerfield.

Councillors 
The ward is represented by three councillors: Paul Kenny (Lab), Clive Morgan (Lab), and Marie Morgan (Lab).

References

Wigan Metropolitan Borough Council Wards